In propositional logic, conjunction elimination (also called and elimination, ∧ elimination, or simplification) is a valid immediate inference, argument form and rule of inference which makes the inference that, if the conjunction A and B is true, then A is true, and B is true. The rule makes it possible to shorten longer proofs by deriving one of the conjuncts of a conjunction on a line by itself. 

An example in English:
It's raining and it's pouring.
Therefore it's raining.

The rule consists of two separate sub-rules, which can be expressed in formal language as:

and

The two sub-rules together mean that, whenever an instance of "" appears on a line of a proof, either "" or "" can be placed on a subsequent line by itself. The above example in English is an application of the first sub-rule.

Formal notation 
The conjunction elimination sub-rules may be written in sequent notation:

 
and
 

and expressed as truth-functional tautologies or theorems of propositional logic:

and

References 

Rules of inference
Theorems in propositional logic

sv:Matematiskt uttryck#Förenkling